Chhuzagang Gewog (Dzongkha: ཆུ་འཛག་སྒང་) is a gewog (village block) of Sarpang District, Bhutan.

References

Gewogs of Bhutan
Sarpang District